Brake Masters is a privately held automotive repair chain based in Tucson, Arizona. The company has over 100 stores throughout the Southwestern United States, including multiple stores in Arizona, California, Nevada, New Mexico and Texas. The company was founded by two Israeli immigrants, Eric and Shalom Laytin, who in their early twenties came to the United States. The two brothers formed Auto Brakes, Inc. in February 1982. In October 1983, the name of the store was changed to Brake Masters, and in May 1984, the company opened a second store. A third store opened in March 1989, and the company decided to expand into other markets. Its first franchise store opened in Sierra Vista in August 1994. 

Brake Masters specializes in brake repair, offering installation of many replacement parts, including water pumps, starters, alternators, CV boots, U-joints and axles. Other services include oil changes, tire rotation, radiator, brake and transmission fluid exchanges, belts, hoses, batteries and air conditioning service and replacement. The company partners with Valvoline, Bendix and Monroe for products, employs ASE Certified (Automotive Service Excellence) Technicians in the majority of their stores, and has been accredited with the Better Business Bureau since 1986. 19 customer complaints about Brake Masters have been lodged with the Better Business Bureau of Southern Arizona during the past three years.

Brake masters has been investigated by ABC news and was found to be charging slightly more than advertised for oil changes. Management response was that this was a computer error that would be fixed.

Fraud case
In 2002 the California Department of Consumer Affairs accused eight Brake Masters shops of fraud. Their licenses were revoked.

References

Automotive companies of the United States
Fraud in the United States